The Reynard 96I is an open-wheel racing car designed and built by Reynard Racing Cars that competed in the 1996  and 1997 IndyCar seasons, notable for winning the first CART race it entered, and the constructors' and drivers' titles later that year, being driven by Jimmy Vasser.

References

American Championship racing cars
Reynard Motorsport vehicles